Razzia (from , romanized according to French orthography into "Razzia") is a 2017 Moroccan drama film directed by Nabil Ayouch. It was selected as the Moroccan entry for the Best Foreign Language Film at the 90th Academy Awards, but it was not nominated. Razzia is mostly set in Casablanca and characters frequently discuss the 1942 film Casablanca.

Plot
In Casablanca and the Atlas Mountains, five different stories interconnect over a 30-year period.

Cast
 Maryam Touzani as Salima
 Arieh Worthalter as Joe
 Amine Ennaji as Abdallah
 Abdelilah Rachid as Hakim 
 Dounia Binebine as Inès
 Abdellah Didane as Ilyas

See also
 List of submissions to the 90th Academy Awards for Best Foreign Language Film
 List of Moroccan submissions for the Academy Award for Best Foreign Language Film

References

External links
 

2017 films
2017 drama films
Moroccan drama films
2010s Arabic-language films
Berber-language films
2010s French-language films
Films directed by Nabil Ayouch
2017 multilingual films
Moroccan multilingual films